Saint-Flavien is a municipality in the Municipalité régionale de comté de Lotbinière in Quebec, Canada. It is part of the Chaudière-Appalaches region and the population is 1,594 as of 2009. It is named after archbishop Pierre-Flavien Turgeon.

History
Although the new constitution dates from 1999 (as a result of the amalgamation of the parish and the village of Saint-Flavien), the area was settled since 1800. The original territory of Saint-Flavien, part of the seigneurie of Sainte-Croix, was split several times for the creation of the communities of Notre-Dame-du-Sacré-Cœur-d'Issoudun (1903), Dosquet (1912), the village of Saint-Flavien (1912), Saint-Janvier-de-Joly (1928) and Laurier-Station (1951).

References

External links

Commission de toponymie du Québec
Ministère des Affaires municipales, des Régions et de l'Occupation du territoire

Municipalities in Quebec
Incorporated places in Chaudière-Appalaches
Designated places in Quebec
Lotbinière Regional County Municipality